Newbold Pacey is a village and civil parish  south of Warwick, in the Stratford-on-Avon district of Warwickshire, England. The parish includes the hamlet of Ashorne and the parish council is called "Newbold Pacey & Ashorne Parish Council". In 2011 the parish had a population of 267. The parish touches Bishop's Tachbrook, Charlecote, Chesterton and Kingston, Lighthorne, Moreton Morrell, Wasperton and Wellesbourne and Walton. Newbold Pacey is within a conservation area.

History 
The name "Newbold" means 'New building', the "Pacy" part from the de Pasci family. Newbold Pacey was recorded in the Domesday Book as Niwebold.

Features 
There are 20 listed buildings in Newbold Pacey. Newbold Pacey has a church called St George.

References

External links 
 Parish council

 
 

Villages in Warwickshire
Civil parishes in Warwickshire
Stratford-on-Avon District